Rhythmeen is the twelfth studio album by the American rock band ZZ Top, released in 1996. It is their last album with longtime producer Bill Ham.

Production and recording
Billy recalls "Rick Rubin has turned me on to one of his acts called Barkmarket and that the guitar player uses C# and B tunings so we began experimenting with really low tunings." Around the Rhythmeen era Billy's collection of African artifacts began and several tracks include African tribal percussion.

This is when Billy began to sport the Nudu Hat, woven by the Bamileke tribe in Cameroon, Africa.

Gibbons uses an early 1950s Les Paul Goldtop guitar and is featured prominently throughout the album.

“We originally had a working title of ‘Nearing The Completion Stage'. But, it was the backbeat, that mean groove, which hit us as a strong recurring element of the album. So, we did our customary play on words, shuffling words about until we came up with our own invention – a feel-good elixir named Rhythmeen.”

Reception

Allmusic gave it a mixed review, stating: "ZZ Top's long-awaited return to blues finally arrived in 1996, well over a decade after they abandoned their simple three-chord boogie for a synth and drum machine-driven three-chord boogie."

The album peaked at number 29 on the Billboard 200 and at number 32 on the UK Albums Chart.

Track listing

Bonus track [Japan]

Personnel
Billy Gibbons – guitar, vocals
Dusty Hill – bass, keyboards, vocals
Frank Beard – drums, percussion
James Harman - harmonica on "What's Up With That"
Greg Morrow - percussion, drums (credited as 'Gangzz Clangzz & Percussion Thangzz') on "She's Just Killing Me" and other tracks

Production
Producers – Billy Gibbons, Bill Ham
Engineer – Joe Hardy
Assistant engineers – Lizzie Harrah, Gary Moon
Mixing – Joe Hardy
Mastering – Bob Ludwig
Director – Douglas Biro
Art direction – Sean Mosher-Smith
Design – Billy Gibbons, Sean Mosher-Smith
Photography – James Bland
Studio - John Moran's House of Funk aka Digital Services Recording

Charts
Album – Billboard (United States)

Singles – Billboard (United States)

References

ZZ Top albums
1996 albums
Albums produced by Billy Gibbons
Albums produced by Bill Ham
RCA Records albums